Sámuel Reuss (Slovenská Ľupča, 8 September 1783 – Revúca, 2 December 1852) was a Lutheran pastor and ethnographer.

Early life and career 
Samuel Reuss was married on November 21, 1810 and his wife was Rozália Schulek. Six of their children were born and five children reached adulthood.

Reuss began his studies in Ožďany, continued in the upper classes at Kežmarok, and completed a course in theology at the Lutheran High School in Bratislava between 1802 and 1805. He then continued his studies at the University of Jena on 16 October 1805. Abroad he learned from teachers Johann Jakob Griesbach and Heinrich Karl Eichstädt, Johann Gottfried Herder and Goethe and became the Secretary of the Mineralogical Society and a full member of the Latin Society. On October 14, 1806, he was present on the side of the Prussians in the Battle of Jena. He was elected as the Hungarian member of the Mineralogical Society at Jena in 1806.

Returning from Germany, he was appointed as a replacement teacher in Banská Bystrica on November 1, 1806. He was a principal and assistant pastor (chaplain) on Tisovec from September 10, 1807 to December 1809. From January 1, 1810 he worked as a pastor for 3 years in Kraskovo. From 19 April 1812 he is the Lutheran pastor of Revuca until 1842. He climbed the hirerachy of the diocese of Gemer, became an archdeacon in 1824 from which position he resigned around 1836.

He was also a public notary for some time, but also worked as an archaeologist. He did research in Kamenný Janko, which is part of a spectacular natural formation of the Pokorágy Hills in Slovakia. The Bronze Age urn tombs found here, covered with stone slabs, were discovered and researched already at the beginning of the 19th century, Sámuel Reuss excavated further tombs in 1813. In 1822 he founded the Slovak Library in Revúca. As a result of his studies in Jena, he carried out extensive research in the fields of history, archeology, ethnography, Slovak folk tales, mineralogy and ornithology in addition to ecclesiastical topics. His publications were published in Slovak, German and Hungarian.

Together with his three sons, Gusztáv, Adolf, and Ludevít, he started the regular collection of Slovak folk tales, revised them and wrote about the theoretics of the stories. He tried to explain the prehistoric history of the Slovaks with the help of folk tales, and he was the first to do so in Slovakia. At the time of the revolution in 1848 he became a lieutenant. On February 14, 1850, he was appointed administrator of the Tisza district by decree of Haynau by the Royal Imperial Government of Austria, a position he held until his death. When he fell ill, he was cared for by his son, Gusztáv Reuss - who was invited to Revúca in 1851 as a city doctor.

Notable works 
 Ueber die Kirchen-Disciplin bei den Protestanten der praktische Theil fehlt.
 Das Privilegium fori bei den Protestanten in Ungarn (1838)
 Ueber Begräbnisse und Begräbnissörter. Ein Beitrag zum protestantischen Kirchenrechte (1841–1842)

Sources 
 Hörk József: Az Ev. Tisza-Kerület püspökei. (superintendensek) Kassa. 1888.
 Abel-Mokos: Magyarországi tanulók a jenai egyetemen. Budapest, 1890. 92. l.
 Béla Sipos: Terray-Reuss-Schulek and related upland family trees. The Terray family. www.terray.hu family history page.
József Szinnyei: Hungarian writers and their works. Budapest, 1791. Reuss Sámuel.
Opinion on the works of Sámuel Reuss: Robert Hammel’s study examines Reuss’s citations in terms of their critical edition and distinguishes three categories: 1.the sources are listed correctly; 2. the references to the sources are incorrect and are therefore corrected: 3. a free revision of the original text, which aims at clarity. The article discusses the possibilities of identifying the sources cited by Reuss and suggests possible solutions to the citations in the critical edition.
The ancestors of Samuel Reuss: :hu:Reuss család (felvidéki)

References 

1783 births
1852 deaths
People from Banská Bystrica District
Hungarian ethnographers
Slovak Lutherans
People from Revúca
Hungarian Lutheran clergy